Holy Trinity Church, Heath Town, is in Heath Town, a district of Wolverhampton, West Midlands, England.  It is an active Anglican parish church in the deanery of Wolverhampton, the archdeaconry of Walsall, and the diocese of Lichfield. The church has been designated by English Heritage as a Grade II listed building.

History

The first church was built between 1850 and 1852 to the 1849 designs of architect Edward Banks.  It was consecrated by the Bishop of Lichfield on 22 July 1852.

It comprised a nave and aisles, with north porch and south entrance under the tower. The chancel had an organ chamber on the north side, separated by a stone screen and a vestry. The whole of the exterior and interior is dressed stone and the seats and doors made of oak. The chancel floor was laid with Minton encaustic tiles. It was constructed by G and F Higham of Wolverhampton.

Interior

According to Pevsner Holy Trinity is 'A well-proportioned example of an Ecclesiological church with good interior features.'

Churchyard

The church is surrounded by a large churchyard which is still used for burials. The initial area closest to the church, known as the 'Old Ground', opened with the church in 1852. Since then the churchyard has been extended several times and now covers approximately seven acres in an irregular shape.

Two structures in the churchyard have been designated by English Heritage as a Grade II listed buildings. These are the lych gate which is also a war memorial and dates from c.1920 and the Jacobean style almshouses of c.1850, restored 1996.

Graves of historical interest
Daisy Alcock (1903-1996), calligrapher
Thomas Barrett (1891-1924), English motor-racing riding mechanic
George Bates (1879-1958), Mayor of Wolverhampton 1941-1942
26 war graves from World War I.
27 war graves from World War II.

References

External links
Wolverhampton's Listed Buildings

English Gothic architecture in the West Midlands
Gothic Revival church buildings in England
Church of England church buildings in the West Midlands (county)
Churches completed in 1852
Grade II listed churches in the West Midlands (county)
1852 establishments in England
Scheduled monuments in the West Midlands (county)
Diocese of Lichfield
Gothic Revival architecture in the West Midlands (county)